"Dem Jeans" is a song by American rapper Chingy. It's the second and final single off his third album Hoodstar (2006). The song is produced by and features rapper Jermaine Dupri. The song peaked at number 59 on the Billboard Hot 100, his first single to not reach the top 40 on that chart. It did better on the Hot Rap Songs and Hot R&B/Hip-Hop Songs charts respectively. Bun B & David Banner made cameo appearances in the promotional video. "Dem Jeans" was heard on the 100th episode of "CSI: Miami," the fourth episode of the fourth season of "The O.C." and in the 2007 film Norbit.

Commercial performance
"Dem Jeans" debuted on the Billboard Hot 100 the week of November 18, 2006 at number 93. It peaked at number 59 on the week of December 9, 2006, staying on the chart for nine weeks. It was Chingy's first single to not reach the top 40 on that chart.

Charts

References

2006 singles
2006 songs
Chingy songs
Jermaine Dupri songs
Capitol Records singles
Song recordings produced by Jermaine Dupri
Songs written by Jermaine Dupri
Music videos directed by Erik White
Songs written by LRoc
Songs written by Chingy